Yonny Hernández may refer to:

 Yonny Hernández (baseball), (born 1998), Venezuelan professional baseball infielder
 Yonny Hernández (motorcyclist) (born 1988), Colombian motorcycle racer